Ahmed Hussain (born 30 May 1941) was a member of the 6th Lok Sabha of India. He represented the Dhubri constituency of Assam from 1977 to 1980 and is a member of the Indian National Congress political party.

References

1941 births
Indian National Congress politicians
Living people
Bengali politicians
Indian Muslims
India MPs 1977–1979
People from Bongaigaon district
Lok Sabha members from Assam
Indian National Congress politicians from Assam